Two submarines of the United States Navy have been named USS Cavalla, after the cavalla, a fish of the pompano family.

 , was a  attack submarine commissioned in 1973 and in service until 1998.

United States Navy ship names